The Man Without a Face is a 1935 British drama film directed by George King and starring Carol Coombe, Cyril Chosack and Moore Marriott. It was made as a quota quickie at Walton Studios.

Synopsis
A man wrongly convicted of murder is able to escape when he is involved in a train crash and changes identity with another passenger, not realising that he is the real killer.

Cast
 Carol Coombe as Joan Ellis  
 Cyril Chosack as Billy Desmond  
 Moore Marriott as Tinker John  
 Ronald Ritchie as Paul Keefe  
 Billy Holland as Detective  
 Ben Williams as Warder  
 Fred Withers 
 Vi Kaley as Landlady

References

Bibliography
 Chibnall, Steve. Quota Quickies: The Birth of the British 'B' Film. British Film Institute, 2007.
 Low, Rachael. Filmmaking in 1930s Britain. George Allen & Unwin, 1985.
 Wood, Linda. British Films, 1927-1939. British Film Institute, 1986.

External links

1935 films
British drama films
1935 drama films
Films directed by George King
Quota quickies
Films shot at Nettlefold Studios
Films set in Kent
Films set in London
British black-and-white films
1930s English-language films
1930s British films